Moodtapes are a series of nature/relaxation videos and audio collectibles (DVD, LD, CD) produced, directed, and filmed by award winning producer and director Ron Roy. They were some of the first of the New Age nature documentary/music genre in the 1980s and 1990s along with Windham Hill and Narada Productions. 

They include Roy's original cinematography of natural scenery edited in perfect harmony to soothing original instrumental music by Ron Roy  and various other professional composers.

Sixteen videos including Serenity, Ocean Reflections, Whispering Waters, Nature's Bouquet, Autumn Whispers...Winter Dreams, Pacific Surf, Contemporary Christmas etc, eight audio CD's, 6 Singles and numerous specialty music videos    were released by Moodtapes and Ron Roy from 1986 to 2019.

Credits
Ron Roy served as the producer, director and cinematographer on all the video productions and the producer/composer of original music on Pacific Surf, Whispering Waters, Contemporary Christmas, Sizzlin' Christmas and others.  

He also designed all the productions album covers and artwork utilizing the original photos he took while on location for each project. 

While filming one production, Ocean Reflections, Roy joined the San Diego State University Marine Mammal Research and Conservation team capturing bottlenose dolphin images with R. H. Defran, the director of the Cetacean Behavior Laboratory for his Moodtape Ocean Reflections.

Moodtapes musical presentations have been played in heavy rotation on Musical Starstreams, Los Angeles smooth jazz station KTWV - The Wave and numerous radio networks coast to coast. They charted Top Twenty on the national Adult Contemporary Music charts and Moodtapes iTunes podcast Relax with Moodtapes achieved top ten status in their Fitness & Nutrition category.   

Moodtapes only solo CD release Energy was produced by Ray Colcord, an ASCAP, BMI, and Drama-Logue Award winner. Colcord also produced Aerosmith's second album Get Your Wings as well as numerous TV themes such as The Simpsons, Big Brother, The Facts of Life, Silver Spoons, and Boy Meets World.

Most recently, Ron Roy has become involved in Americana music as a composer, producer and singer/songwriter. His recent releases Now It's All Just Stuff, Bible Belted, You Could Hear The Sound of Panties Drop and You'll Never Ever Be Alone At Christmas  have received worldwide airplay on numerous terrestrial and streaming stations including Renegade Radio Nashville, Trucker Radio Nashville, The BandWagon Network Radio, Jango Radio, ReverbNation and more.

Roy’s Yuletide song "You’ll Never Ever Be Alone At Christmas" charted #1 on RadioAirplay’s popularity charts  and was named one of the Best New Holiday Songs four years in a row in their international Independent Songwriters Holiday Contest. It was also featured as the “Premiere Christmas Song” on Nashville’s Worldwide Trucker Radio Network whose Radio icon DJ Stan Campbell proclaimed: “The song is so relatable... I recommend it for ever radio station for Christmas!”

Roy’s Americana songs also landed him at #1 in his hometown on ReverbNation’s Americana Regional Charts  and are also featured continuously on iTunes, Spotify, and more.

Album releases

Media coverage 
	

The Moodtapes videos and music received national critical acclaim in Billboard,  the Los Angeles Times , The New York Times  and numerous others.  They have been featured on leading national entertainment television shows such as Entertainment Tonight,  The 700 Club, Live with Regis, The Oprah Winfrey Show   as well as various other regional talk shows.

Therapeutic reviews
Various authors have recommended Moodtapes in their publications to use for relaxation and to treat insomnia.

Commercial success
Moodtapes reached their greatest commercial success during the 1980s, 1990s, and early 2000s by becoming bestsellers in thousands of specialty stores in the United States, most notably The Nature Company outlets, Natural Wonders specialty stores, and also reaching an audience of millions via the Reader's Digest Video Catalogs . Bloomingdale's department stores also featured Moodtapes as A Best Bet Gift Idea in 1988.

References

External links
 
 
 Moodtapes at iTunes
 Moodtapes at CD Baby
 
 Moodtapes’ stream at Rdio
 Moodtapes’ discography at Discogs

20th-century classical music
New-age albums
Holiday songs
Music video compilation albums